Snell Patel (born 15 October 1993) is an Indian cricketer. He made his first-class debut for Saurashtra in the 2014–15 Ranji Trophy on 6 February 2015. He made his List A debut for Saurashtra in the 2016–17 Vijay Hazare Trophy on 28 February 2017.

In August 2019, he was named in the India Blue team's squad for the 2019–20 Duleep Trophy.

References

External links
 

1993 births
Living people
Indian cricketers
Rajasthan cricketers
People from Rajkot